Erik Falkenburg (born 5 May 1988) is a Dutch professional footballer who plays as an attacking midfielder.

Club career
Born in Leiden, he came through the youth system at and made his professional debut for Sparta Rotterdam on 23 January 2008 against PSV. At Sparta he played alongside future international players Kevin Strootman and Nick Viergever. He and Viergever left the club for AZ in 2010. Not a regular starter at AZ, he joined NEC on loan in January 2013 and he was sent on loan the next season to Go Ahead Eagles.

After his contract with AZ expired in summer 2014, Falkenburg moved to NAC, who surprisingly beat Cambuur, Go Ahead and Willem II for his signature despite being in financial trouble. He did join Willem II however the next season after NAC was relegated to the Eerste Divisie. The attacking midfielder changed clubs once more, when he teamed up with ADO Den Haag in 2017.

On 10 September 2020, Falkenburg signed a one-year contract with Roda JC Kerkrade in the Eerste Divisie. He left the club as his contract expired in July 2021.

International career
Falkenburg played three matches for the Netherlands U-21s in 2009 and 2010, scoring three goals.

Career statistics

References

External links
 
 Voetbal International profile 
 

1988 births
Living people
Footballers from Leiden
Association football midfielders
Dutch footballers
Netherlands under-21 international footballers
Sparta Rotterdam players
AZ Alkmaar players
NEC Nijmegen players
Go Ahead Eagles players
NAC Breda players
Willem II (football club) players
ADO Den Haag players
Roda JC Kerkrade players
Eredivisie players
Eerste Divisie players